John Brill (born 1951 in Newark, New Jersey) is an American photographer, known for his conceptual and subversive approach to the techniques and language inherent in the photographic process. John Brill is represented by Kent Fine Art in New York.

Life
John Brill has been creating photographic records of his everyday existence since 1959. Self-taught in photography, his shift to art in 1981 followed his formal studies within the field of physiological psychology. From the mid-1970s through the 1980s, the artist drove a beer truck in the northeast corner of New Jersey, absorbing the raw visual beauty of a vast industrial wasteland, where he began shooting his seminal series of portraits and self-portraits. He is a self-taught photographer, who has exhibited regularly since the 1980s when Bill Arning of White Columns discovered his work and subsequently gave him his first solo show. Brill has been a school bus driver in Madison, New Jersey for over 20 years and is represented by Kent Fine Art in New York.

Work

John Brill has created several thematically coherent, discrete bodies of work, which include; Family Holiday Album, engrams, ennui, Reliquary, and Cosmophelia. Although his œuvre is composed of versatile and separate bodies of work, all of his images have been created with specific regard for their dual role as two-dimensional representations as well as physical art objects.

Leah Ollman reflects on the artist's early work in the introduction to the 2002 monograph, The Photography of John Brill:

He is present in every step of the creative process, from taking the picture, printing, cutting the glass, and framing the images. Although each of the images he produces necessarily begins its genesis with pure camera vision, all of them undergo an extensive process of post-exposure construction, transcending the seminal act of exposure and inevitably culminating in a polar extreme on the continuum of image transformation. As stated in the text that accompanied his exhibition, Cosmophilia (2003), "The image that is ultimately perceived in the final print is not merely an interpretation of the original camera vision, but is an image—as well as physical object—that exists entirely on its own terms." His love of the process is apparent in his work as he shamelessly pursues new methods of printing and takes risks in creating his work. Some images he prints repeatedly, others he covers in wax, and still others he forms in a process of development that nearly overexposes his subject.

Exhibitions

Solo exhibitions

2006	 – Bad Memory, Kent Gallery, New York
2003	 – Cosmophilia, Kent Gallery, New York
2000	 – Reliquary, Kent Gallery, New York
	    Reliquary, Solomon Projects, Atlanta
1997	 – ennui, Kent Gallery, New York
1995	 – engrams, Kent Gallery, New York
1990 – Family Holiday Album, Coup de Grace Gallery, New York 1988	Selected photographs, 1981–1987, The Sherman H. Masten Gallery, County College of Morris, Randolph, NJ
1986	 – Selected Self-Portraits, 1981–1984, White Columns, New York
1982	 – Twelve Self-Portraits, International Center of Photography, Education Gallery, New York

Group exhibitions

2012 – The Limits of Photography, Museum of Contemporary Photography, Columbia College Chicago, Chicago
2010 – About Face, Edward Thorp Gallery, New York
2007	 – Close Looking, Kent Gallery, New York
2006	 – Urban Cosmologies, Kent Gallery, New York
2005	 – The Constructed Image, Kent Gallery, New York
2003	 – New Jersey State Council on the Arts Fellowship Exhibition, Rutgers University, Camden, NJ
2002 – Endless Summer, Kent Gallery, New York
2001	 – Vox, Kent Gallery, New York
2000	 – The UFO Show, University Gallery, Illinois State University, Normal, IL (catalogue)
1999	 – Dream Architecture, Kent Gallery, New York
		Faces & Places, City Gallery East, Atlanta, GA
		The Xmas Project, Kent Gallery, New York
1998  – The Waking Dream: Psychological Realism in Contemporary Art, Castle Gallery, The College of  New Rochelle, New Rochelle, NY
1997 – Portraits: 19th and 20th Century Photography, Marlborough Gallery, New York
1996	 – Black and White Unfixed, Nancy Solomon Gallery, Atlanta, GA
		Difference, Kent Gallery, New York
		New Jersey State Council on the Arts Fellowship Exhibition, The Noyes Museum, Oceanville, NJ (catalogue)
		White Columns 1996 Benefit Exhibition, White Columns, New York
		Light into Darkness, Kent Gallery, New York
1995 –    Fact, Fiction and Truth: Contemporary Portraits, Lehman College Art Gallery, Bronx, NY (catalogue)
		the camera i: Photographic Self-portraits from the Audry and Sydney Irmas Collection, Los Angeles County Museum of Art (catalogue)
		(untitled group show), Tom Cugliani Gallery, New York
1993	 – Contacts/Proofs, The Jersey City Museum, Jersey City, NJ
1991	 – Fact or Fantasy, Coup de Grace Gallery, New York
1990 – 	New Life, Coup de Grace Gallery, New York
		Brut 90, White Columns, New York
		Twentieth Anniversary Benefit Exhibition, White Columns, New York
		Heads, Coup de Grace Gallery, New York
		New Jersey State Council on the Arts Fellowship Exhibition, New Jersey Center for the Visual Arts, Summit, NJ (catalogue)
1989	 – Selected Photographs: Recent Acquisitions, The Brooklyn Museum
1988	 – Everything You Always Wanted to Know About Life, Coup de Grace Gallery, Hoboken, NJ
1986–87 Update, White Columns, New York (catalogue) New Jersey State Council on the Arts Fellowship Exhibition, The Morris Museum, Morristown, NJ  
1985	 – Image Making, Pavilion Gallery, Mount Holly, NJ (catalogue)
1984	 – (untitled group show), Oggi-Domani, New York
1982 – The World Within, The World Without, The Simon Gallery, Montclair, NJ

References

Living people
1951 births
Outsider artists
American portrait photographers
Photographers from New Jersey